Amadeo Raúl Carrizo Larretape (12 June 1926 – 20 March 2020), popularly known by his first name "Amadeo", was an Argentine football goalkeeper and manager. Carrizo is considered a pioneer of the position, helping to innovate techniques and strategies for goalkeepers. The IFFHS ranked Carrizo as the best South American keeper of the 20th century in 1999.

He was the first goalkeeper in Argentina to wear gloves, following an example by Italy's Giovanni Viola. He also was the first one to regularly leave the penalty area to defend his goal and the first one to use goal kicks as a strategy to start counterattacks. His way of playing has inspired many famous South American keepers, most notably Hugo Orlando Gatti, René Higuita, and José Luis Chilavert. Germany's Manuel Neuer is a more recent exponent of this style.

He made his debut in the Argentine First Division on 6 May 1945, playing for River Plate. The match was against Independiente, River Plate won 2–1.

During his time at River Plate, he played alongside stars such as José Manuel Moreno, Félix Loustau, Adolfo Pedernera, Ángel Labruna and the young Alfredo Di Stéfano. He won seven national Championship trophies in 1945, 1947, 1952, 1953, 1955, 1956 and 1957. With River he also won the Copa Aldao of 1945 and 1947 and the Copa Ibarguren of 1952, and reached the 1966 Copa Libertadores Finals, losing out after three matches against CA Peñarol of Uruguay.

He played for the Argentina national football team with significant success, especially against Brazil, but he also suffered a 6–1 defeat against Czechoslovakia, in the 1958 FIFA World Cup. In 1964 he won with Argentina the Taça das Nações, a tournament held in Brazil, featuring also England and Portugal, to celebrate the 50th anniversary of the Brazilian Football Confederation.

In 1968, Carrizo simultaneously established two records for his time: official matches for  River Plate in the Argentine First Division (521) and consecutive matches without conceding any goals (8, resp. 769 minutes).

In 1969 he reinforced two Peruvian teams in one match for each: Alianza Lima in a match against Lev Yashin's Dynamo Moscow and Club Universitario de Deportes in a match against SC Corinthians Paulista from Brazil.

In April 1969 he joined the Colombian team Millonarios where he ended his career as keeper in April 1970. His sometimes acrobatic saves earned him the moniker Tarzan from the local audience.

In 1973 Carrizo managed Deportivo Armenio, a club from the Province of Buenos Aires and led the team to promotion to the league Primera C. In 1973 he returned to Colombia, to manage first division team Once Caldas, from Manizales, then known as Cristal Caldas.

References 

1926 births
2020 deaths
People from General López Department
Sportspeople from Santa Fe Province
Argentine footballers
Club Atlético River Plate footballers
Millonarios F.C. players
Association football goalkeepers
1958 FIFA World Cup players
Argentina international footballers
Argentine Primera División players
Categoría Primera A players
Argentine expatriate footballers
Expatriate footballers in Colombia